Myanmar–Russia relations are the bilateral relations between Myanmar and Russia. Myanmar has an embassy in Moscow whilst Russia has an embassy in Yangon.

History

The USSR established diplomatic relations with Myanmar upon the latter's independence in 1948, which remain to the present day through Russia. In 2007, alongside China, Russia vetoed a U.N. Security Council resolution condemning alleged human rights abuses and atrocities at the hands of the Myanmar government.

In August 2022, Russian Foreign Minister Sergey Lavrov described Myanmar as a "friendly and longstanding partner."

On 7 September 2022, Myanmar's junta chief Min Aung Hlaing met with Russian President Vladimir Putin on the sidelines of an economic meeting in eastern Russia, the first time that the pair have met since the 2021 Myanmar coup d'état.

Agreements
In June 2016, the two countries signed a defence cooperation agreement. Min Aung Hlaing and Sergei Shoigu announced their intention to expand military cooperation in a 2018 meeting.

Nuclear cooperation

In 2007, Russia and Myanmar did a controversial nuclear research center deal. According to the press release, "The centre will comprise a 10MW light-water reactor working on 20%-enriched uranium-235, an activation analysis laboratory, a medical isotope production laboratory, silicon doping system, nuclear waste treatment and burial facilities".

See also 
 Foreign relations of Myanmar
 Foreign relations of Russia

References

External links

  Documents on the Myanmar–Russia relationship at the Russian Ministry of Foreign Affairs
  Embassy of Russia in Yangon

 
Bilateral relations of Russia
Russia